Brigadier General Thomas Roy Mikolajcik (August 17, 1947 – April 17, 2010) was director of transportation, Office of the Deputy Chief of Staff, logistics, Headquarters United States Air Force, Washington, D.C. He provided guidance and direction to Air Force activities on transportation plans, policy and programs. Also included is the movement of Air Force-sponsored passengers, patients, personal property (household goods, unaccompanied baggage, privately owned vehicles, mobile homes and weapons), and cargo by all modes of commercial and military carriers.

General Mikolajcik was a 1969 graduate of the United States Air Force Academy. He completed pilot training in 1970, and served as a C-141 pilot, instructor, aircraft commander, war plans officer, current operations officer, mobility project officer, and adviser to the chief of staff for airlift and logistics policy. He held several staff positions including as a member of the C-X taskforce that wrote the requirements for the C-17 Globemaster III. He also served as squadron commander, wing vice commander and commander of two wings. Additionally, he was the U.S. Air Force component commander in Somalia from December 1992 to March 1993 during Operation Restore Hope. He was a command pilot with more than 4,000 flying hours.

General Mikolajcik retired from military service on October 1, 1996.

The Mikolajcik Child Development Center at Charleston Air Force Base, South Carolina and the Mikolajcik Engineering Laboratory Center at the Space and Naval Warfare Systems Center (SPAWAR) in Charleston are named in his honor.

Awards and decorations
Mikolajcik's awards include the Legion of Merit (two Oak Leaf Clusters), the Defense Meritorious Service Medal, the Meritorious Service Medal (three Oak Leaf Clusters). He was also honored with the 1993 Norwich Native Son Award.

References

 
 A newsletter describing the center named for him

1947 births
2010 deaths
United States Air Force Academy alumni
United States Air Force generals
Recipients of the Legion of Merit
Military personnel from Norwich, Connecticut